Man-Amplified is the fifth studio album by Clock DVA, released in 1991 by Contempo Records.

Track listing

Personnel 
Adapted from the Man-Amplified liner notes.

Clock DVA
Robert Baker – instruments
Dean Dennis – instruments
Adi Newton – instruments, vocals

Production and additional personnel
Èlʹ Lisickij – photography

Release history

References

External links 
 

1991 albums
Clock DVA albums